Brice Schwab is an American football offensive lineman in the National Football League (NFL) who is currently a free agent. Schwab played college football at Arizona State.

College Football
Schwab played college football at Arizona State. Schwab also played for Palomar Junior College in San Marcos, CA.

Professional career

Tampa Bay Buccaneers
On April 29, 2013, Schwab was signed as an undrafted free agent by the Tampa Bay Buccaneers. On July 31, 2013, Schwab was waived by the Tampa Bay Buccaneers.

New England Patriots
On August 2, 2013, Schwab was signed by the New England Patriots. He was released by the Patriots on August 28, 2013.

References

External links
Tampa Bay Buccaneers bio
Arizona State Sun Devils bio

American football offensive tackles
Arizona State Sun Devils football players
Tampa Bay Buccaneers players
New England Patriots players
Houston Texans players
1990 births
Living people
Palomar Comets football players